The Piano in a Factory is 2010 Chinese drama film. The film is directed by Zhang Meng (director), and stars Qin Hailu and Wang Qianyuan. It tells the story of a father, Chen Guilin, who works very hard to realize his daughter's dream of owning a piano. Although Chen encounters a lot of hardships, he never gives up and is always optimistic.

Plot
Set in the 1990s, laid-off worker Chen Guilin was betrayed by his wife, who remarried a rich business man who has much more money than him. The condition for the custody of their daughter is to give their daughter a piano. Chen tries all means to borrow money from his friends, even attempting to steal a piano, but all his attempts fail. 
Despite these challenges, Chen always maintains an optimistic outlook. Finally, he decides to build a piano with his friends.

The group eventually build a piano which is made of steel. He also organizes a band to make a living and uses his wisdom to create a life which is full of sound and color.

Cast
 Wang Qianyuan as Chen Guilin
 Jang Shin-young as Chen's wife
 Qin Hailu

Reception

Accolades

References
Notes

External links
 
 The Piano in a Factory on Douban Movie 

2010 films
2010 drama films
Films directed by Zhang Meng
Chinese drama films